Seleh Chin-e Olya (also Romanized as Seleh Chīn-e ‘Olyā; also known as Salahchīn, Selehchīn, and Selehchīn-e Sorlā) is a village in Jannat Makan Rural District, in the Central District of Gotvand County, Khuzestan Province, Iran. At the 2006 census, its population was 15, in 4 families.

References 

Populated places in Gotvand County